is a Japanese judoka. She won the 57 kg-category bronze medal at the Sydney Olympics in 2000.

She is a graduate of Junshin Junior College. She was an officer of the Fukuoka Prefectural Police. She retired from the police in March 2005 and got married in October 2005.

References

External links
 
 
 
 

1978 births
Living people
Japanese female judoka
Japanese police officers
Judoka at the 2000 Summer Olympics
Olympic bronze medalists for Japan
Olympic judoka of Japan
Sportspeople from Fukuoka (city)
Olympic medalists in judo
Asian Games medalists in judo
Judoka at the 1998 Asian Games
Judoka at the 2002 Asian Games
Medalists at the 2000 Summer Olympics
Asian Games silver medalists for Japan
Asian Games bronze medalists for Japan
Medalists at the 1998 Asian Games
Medalists at the 2002 Asian Games
Judoka at the 2004 Summer Olympics
20th-century Japanese women
21st-century Japanese women